York Run is a tributary of Bowman Creek in Wyoming County, Pennsylvania, in the United States. The surficial geology in its vicinity consists of alluvium, Wisconsinan Till, alluvial fan, and Wisconsinan Ice-Contact Stratified Drift. The watershed of the stream is designated as a High-Quality Coldwater Fishery and a Migratory Fishery and the stream is Class A Wild Trout Waters.

Course

York Run begins near the edge of a plateau in Noxen Township. It flows east-northeast for a short distance as its valley becomes much deeper. The stream then turns east-southeast for several tenths of a mile before turning south-southeast. After several tenths of a mile, it reaches the border of the census-designated place of Noxen. It flows along the border of Noxen in a south-southeasterly direction for several tenths of a mile before reaching its confluence with Bowman Creek.

Hydrology
York Run is not designated as an impaired waterbody.

Mehoopany Wind Energy, LLC. once applied for and/or received a National Pollutant Discharge Elimination System to discharge stormwater into York Run during construction activities.

Geography and geology

The surficial geology near the mouth of York Run mainly consists of alluvium, alluvial fan, and Wisconsinan Ice-Contact Stratified Drift. Further upstream, the surficial geology consists of Wisconsinan Till and alluvium, but bedrock consisting of sandstone and shale is also in the area.

Watershed
The stream is entirely within the United States Geological Survey quadrangle of Noxen.

The entire length of York Run is on private land that is closed to access.

History
York Run was entered into the Geographic Names Information System on August 2, 1979. Its identifier in the Geographic Names Information System is 1199825.

Biology
The drainage basin of York Run is designated as a High-Quality Coldwater Fishery and a Migratory Fishery. Wild trout naturally reproduce in the stream from its headwaters downstream to its mouth. It is designated by the Pennsylvania Fish and Boat Commission as Class A Wild Trout Waters for brook trout from its headwaters downstream to its mouth.

In 2002, the lichen species Biatora longispora and  Biatora printzenii, of the genus Biatora were observed in the vicinity of York Run.

See also
Hettesheimer Run, next tributary of Bowman Creek going downstream
Stone Run (Bowman Creek), next tributary of Bowman Creek going upstream
List of rivers of Pennsylvania
List of tributaries of Bowman Creek

References

Rivers of Wyoming County, Pennsylvania
Tributaries of Bowman Creek
Rivers of Pennsylvania